George Nugent may refer to:

Sir George Nugent, 1st Baronet (1757–1849), British Field Marshal and Governor of Jamaica, MP for Buckingham and Aylesbury
George Nugent, 7th Earl of Westmeath (1760–1814), Lord Delvin, Irish MP for Fore
George Nugent, 1st Marquess of Westmeath (1785–1871), Irish peer
Richard Nugent, Baron Nugent of Guildford (George Richard Hodges Nugent, 1907–1994), British Member of Parliament for Guildford
George Colborne Nugent (1864–1915), British Army officer
George Nugent (footballer) (born 2001), English footballer

See also
George Nugent-Grenville, 2nd Baron Nugent (1788–1850), Irish MP
George Nugent-Temple-Grenville, 1st Marquess of Buckingham (1753–1813), British statesman